Events from the year 1705 in Russia

Incumbents
 Monarch – Peter I

Events

 Naval Infantry (Russia)
 Biryuch
 Rovenky

Births

Deaths

References

 
Years of the 18th century in Russia